This list is of the Places of Scenic Beauty of Japan located within the Prefecture of Saitama.

National Places of Scenic Beauty
As of 1 July 2014, three Places have been designated at a national level; Sanbaseki Gorge spans the prefectural borders with Gunma and Landscape of Oku no Hosomichi is a serial designation spanning ten prefectures.

Prefectural Places of Scenic Beauty
As of 1 July 2014, six Places have been designated at a prefectural level.

Municipal Places of Scenic Beauty
As of 1 May 2013, twenty-four Places have been designated at a municipal level.

See also
 Cultural Properties of Japan
 List of parks and gardens of Saitama Prefecture
 List of Historic Sites of Japan (Saitama)

References

External links
  Cultural Properties of Saitama Prefecture

Tourist attractions in Saitama Prefecture
Places of Scenic Beauty